Alice is an original series created for the Brazilian branch of the HBO Latin America.  The series was produced by HBO's local partner, Gullane Filmes, and directed by Karim Aïnouz and Sérgio Machado. The series debuted in Latin America on September 21, 2008, with a season consisting of thirteen episodes, ending on December 14, 2008. A special two episodes was introduced in 2010. One year later, the show was canceled by the channel.

The series stars Andréia Horta who plays Alice, a young woman who leaves her small town to live in São Paulo, where she meets several people who help her to better understand herself. The series is characterized by a multitude of characters, the arguments of introspection in the protagonist's inner journey and its realistic portrayal of the city and its inhabitants, showing examples of different lifestyles of many people in the metropolis.

Sergio Machado and Karim Aïnouz, who are also the creators and writers of the series, were responsible for the direction, although several episodes were directed by two guest directors.

Overview
The series follows the story of Alice, a 25-year-old woman who comes from Palmas to São Paulo to receive a small inheritance from her father. Upon arriving in São Paulo, Alice meets a new world, where she makes new friends, living new experiences that will cause decisive changes in her life. Alice sinks into the excitement of the cosmopolitan and cultural landscape of the city of São Paulo.

Episodes
The series consists of 15 episodes. 13 corresponding to the first season, and the other two were made as television films.

 Pela toca do coelho
 O tesouro de Alice
 O retorno de Elvira Cipriani
 No jardim das flores perdidas
 Os peixinhos dourados de Dona Sumiko
 O lado Escuro do espelho
 Wonderland
 A guerra de Alice
 Em busca do ouro
 Na cidade de Alice
 A mil quilômetros por hora
 Queda livre
 À flor da pele

Special episodes 

In 2010, two special episodes were shown. In them we find Alice, her friends and family two years after arriving in São Paulo. These episodes were shown on 21 and 28 November 2010.

 O Primeiro Dia Do Resto Da Minha Vida
 A Última Noite

Characters

Main

 Alice (Andréia Horta)
 Dani (Luka Omoto)
 Nicolas (Vinicius Zinn)
 Luli (Regina Braga)
 Dora (Denise Weinberg)
 Regina Célia (Daniela Piepszyk)

Recurring

 Glícia (Walderez de Barros)
 Marcela (Gabrielle Lopez)
 Téo (Juliano Cazarré)
 Irislene (Carla Ribas)
 Henrique (Marat Descartes)
 Lorenzo (Eduardo Moscovis)
 Renata (Guta Ruiz)

Soundtrack
The main theme of the series was composed by Instituto, a musical group that mixes typically Brazilian sounds such as samba, ballad and folk rhythms with dub beats, hip hop and electronic music.

Instituto & Irina Gatsalova - Wonderland (Main Theme)
808 Sex - In the track
Fabio Góes - Sem mentira
Edu K feat Deize Tigrona - Sex-O-Matic
Instituto & Gui Amabis - City Lights
Hot Chip - Just Like We (Breakdown) (DFA Remix)
Estela Cassilatti - Al (4:43)
Estela Cassilatti - Meu Siêncio
Boss In Drama - All the Love (Telequete Wonderland)
3 na Massa - Enladeirada (Tejo RMX)
Fabio Góes feat. CéU - Sun of your eyes
Instituto - Choro (3:17)
Fabio Góes - Sereno
Irina Gatsalova & Anvil FX - Latin Lover
Turbo Trio Part. Deize Tigrona, Bonde Do Role e Chernobyl - Ela tá na festa (Chernobyl RMX)
Gabbi - Till The Moment You Sleep
Curumin - Guerreiro
Turbo Trio - Genius 2099
Irina Gatsalova & Anvil FX - Punk It

Broadcast 
 Latin America – HBO
  – Fox Life

References

External links
 Official page at HBO
 Alice at Fox Life Portugal  (in Portuguese)
 

2000s Brazilian television series
2008 Brazilian television series debuts
2010 Brazilian television series endings
Brazilian drama television series
HBO Latin America original programming
Portuguese-language HBO original programming
Portuguese-language television shows
Television shows filmed in São Paulo (state)
Television shows set in São Paulo